Have a Holly Jolly Christmas is a Christmas album by American folk singer Burl Ives, first released by Decca Records in October 1965 (recorded in November 1964).  It peaked at #32 on Billboard'''s Best Bets For Christmas album chart on December 2, 1967.

Ives had recorded two of the songs on the album ("A Holly Jolly Christmas" and "Rudolph the Red-Nosed Reindeer") previously for the Rudolph the Red-Nosed Reindeer soundtrack, but he recorded new versions for Have a Holly Jolly Christmas''. "A Holly Jolly Christmas" in particular had a significantly different and slower arrangement, which is more commonly heard today. This version had already been released as a single the previous year, with a B-side of "Snow for Johnny", which he also featured on the album.

Track listing

Personnel
Burl Ives – lead vocals
Owen Bradley – director of chorus and orchestra

Charts

References
Decca DL 4689 (mono), DL 74689 (stereo), 1965 vinyl LP release
MCA 15002 (1977 LP re-issue) at discogs.com 
MCAD 25992 (1995 CD re-issue) at discogs.com 

1965 Christmas albums
Burl Ives albums
Decca Records albums
Albums produced by Milt Gabler
Christmas albums by American artists
Covers albums
Folk Christmas albums
Pop Christmas albums